Shawn Womack (born August 13, 1972) is an American lawyer and judge serving as an associate justice of the Arkansas Supreme Court. He is formerly a circuit court judge for the 14th Judicial District of Arkansas. Earlier, Womack served from 2001 to 2009 as a  state senator for District 1, which includes his own Baxter County. During part of his Senate tenure, Womack was the Senate Minority Leader. From 1999 to 2003, he was a member of the Arkansas House of Representatives.

A native of Shawnee, Kansas, Womack, a licensed attorney, owns the Womack Law Firm in Mountain Home, Arkansas. In the legislature he was chairman of the Joint Budget Committee, the Desegregation Litigation Oversight Committee, and the Desegregation Lawsuit Resolution Task Force. He was the vice-chairman of the Senate Judiciary Committee and was formerly chairman of the Legislative Task Force on District Courts and the Litigation Reports Oversight Committee. He sits on the Member Council of State Government's Legal Task Force, which is responsible for reviewing briefs before submissions to the United States Supreme Court.

He has been recognized by the Arkansas District Judges Council, Arkansas State University, the Arkansas Prosecuting Attorneys Association, the AARP, the Arkansas Volunteer Lawyers for the elderly, the Arkansas Municipal Police Association, the Arkansas Environmental Federation, the American Heart Association, and the Arkansas Judicial Council. The American Family Association of Arkansas gave him an 80% evaluation.

Womack graduated from Mountain Home High School, the University of Central Arkansas in Conway with a Bachelor of Business Administration and Accounting, and the University of Arkansas School of Law at Fayetteville.  Womack is a member of the Kappa Sigma fraternity (Nu-Kappa/University of Central Arkansas).

External links

Arkansas State Legislature - Senator Shawn Womack official government website
Project Vote Smart - Senator Shawn A. Womack (AR) profile
Follow the Money - Shawn A Womack
2006 2004 2002 2000 campaign contributions

1972 births
Living people
University of Central Arkansas alumni
University of Arkansas School of Law alumni
People from Shawnee, Kansas
People from Mountain Home, Arkansas
Arkansas state court judges
Arkansas lawyers
Justices of the Arkansas Supreme Court
21st-century American judges
Republican Party members of the Arkansas House of Representatives
Republican Party Arkansas state senators